Nida Mumtaz is a Pakistani actress. She is known for her roles in dramas Kahin Deep Jaley, Deewangi and Khoob Seerat. She is also known for her roles in movies Wrong No. and Mehrunisa V Lub U.

Early life
Nida was born in 1960 on September 10th in Karachi, Pakistan. She completed her studies from University of Karachi.

Career
Nida made her debut as an actress in 1984 with her mother Salma Mumtaz who was a very famous actress in PTV dramas. She starred in a drama produced by her uncle Pervaiz Nasir on PTV Channel. She then joined another drama in 1986 in which she starred with her aunt Shammi. In 1980s and 1990s she appeared in many PTV classic dramas. She was noted for portraying innocent and kind characters.

Personal life
Nida Mumtaz is married and has three children two son and one daughter. Nida's aunt Shammi was an actress and her uncle Pervaiz Nasir was film producer and her mother Salma Mumtaz who was also an actress died in 2012 then she took a break and then she returned. Nida is the aunt of actress and model Sadaf Kanwal.

Filmography

Television

Telefilm

Film

References

External links
 
 
 

1960 births
Living people
20th-century Pakistani actresses
Actresses in Punjabi cinema
Pakistani television actresses
Actresses in Pashto cinema
21st-century Pakistani actresses
Pakistani film actresses
Actresses in Urdu cinema